John Horsley may refer to:

John Horsley (antiquarian) (1685–1732), British antiquarian
John Callcott Horsley (1817–1903), English painter
John Horsley (actor) (1920–2014), English actor
John Horsley (MP) for Worcestershire (UK Parliament constituency)